In Polish poetry, the Ukrainian school were a group of Romantic poets of the early 19th century who hailed from the southeastern fringes of the Polish-inhabited lands of the time (this period followed the partition of the Polish–Lithuanian Commonwealth; today mostly part of Ukraine). The poets—Antoni Malczewski, Józef Bohdan Zaleski, Tomasz Padura Aleksander Groza and Seweryn Goszczyński—produced a distinct style of Polish Romanticism through the incorporation of Ukrainian life, landscapes, history, political events, and folklore into their works. They in turn influenced both Lithuanian and Ukrainian Romantic poetry, and, along with other Polish poets, constituted a link between the various literatures of the post-partition Commonwealth.

References

External links
 Ukrainian School in Polish literature at the Encyclopedia of Ukraine

Polish poetry
19th century in Poland

Poland–Ukraine relations
Kingdom of Galicia and Lodomeria
Poetry movements
Romantic nationalism
19th-century literature
Ukrainian poetry